Artsmark is the creative quality standard for schools and education settings, awarded by Arts Council England. The Artsmark award provides a clear framework for teachers and education professionals to plan, develop and evaluate their arts and cultural provision.

Types of awards
Artsmark is awarded at three levels:
 Gold 
 Silver
 Platinum

References

External links
 Artsmark website
 Arts Council England

Education in England
Educational awards in the United Kingdom
Arts awards in the United Kingdom
Awards given to schools